Caldisalinibacter is a bacterial genus from the family of Clostridiaceae, with one known species (Caldisalinibacter kiritimatiensis).

References

Clostridiaceae
Monotypic bacteria genera
Bacteria genera